Chashniki is a town in Vitebsk Region, Belarus. It is famous for the Battle of Ula during the Livonian War and the Battle of Chashniki that took place during the French invasion of Russia in 1812.

People 
 Ryhor Reles
 Solomon Zeitlin
 S. Ansky

External links 

 Photos on Radzima.org
 Jewish Cemeteries in Chashniki
 The murder of the Jews of Chashniki during World War II, at Yad Vashem website.

Casniki
Casniki
Populated places in Vitebsk Region
Polotsk Voivodeship
Lepelsky Uyezd
Holocaust locations in Belarus